Anan Buasang (born September 30, 1992), is a Thai former professional footballer who played as a forward.

Honours

Clubs
Bangkok Glass
 Thai FA Cup: 2014

Buriram United
 Kor Royal Cup: 2016

References

External links
 Profile at Goal
https://int.soccerway.com/players/anan-buasang/300976/

Living people
1992 births
Anan Buasang
Anan Buasang
Association football forwards
Anan Buasang
Anan Buasang
Anan Buasang
Anan Buasang
Anan Buasang